WBAE (1490 kHz, "The Bay 107.1/93.5") is a commercial AM radio station licensed to Portland, Maine. Owned by Saga Communications, it broadcasts a soft adult contemporary format. Its  studios and offices are located on Western Avenue in South Portland, and its transmitter is off Forest Avenue in Portland. The Bay primarily features music from soft rock artists and music of the 1970s and 80s, with a few newer titles mixed in.

WBAE can also be heard in the Portland area on its FM translator, W296CZ 107.1 MHz. The station is simulcast in York County, Maine on 1400 WVAE in Biddeford, Maine, which has its own FM translator, W228EE 93.5; the station's current branding is derived from these FM feeds.

History

WBAE was first licensed in 1946 as WMTW, broadcasting on 1490 kHz and licensed to The Yankee Network, Inc. The WMTW call sign was transferred from the original WMTW, an FM station which changed its call letters to WMNE at this time.

On August 1, 1951, WMTW changed call letters to WPOR. For much of its history, it was associated with country music, and when sister station WPOR-FM debuted in October 1967, the two stations were the primary source of country music in the Portland radio market.  The AM and FM stations were mostly simulcast, although for a time, WPOR aired a satellite-delivered syndicated country music format while WPOR-FM featured local announcers and locally programmed country music.

In 1999, WPOR switched its call letters to WBAE. Its original format was adult standards, initially provided by the Music of Your Life network, and later Dial Global's Adult Standards (America's Best Music) service.  WBAE was later simulcast with WVAE in Biddeford to give listeners in York County, Maine a better signal.  WBAE and WVAE had an affiliation with ABC News Radio, and were the local outlets for Paul Harvey, Portland Pirates and the Portland Sea Dogs.  (The Sea Dogs have moved to WPEI and WPPI; Paul Harvey died in 2009, and the Pirates have since moved to WLOB).

The stations adopted a hot talk format, dropping Adult Standards on March 4, 2009.  Hot talk had been heard on co-owned WZAN before that station shifted to a political talk format.  Hot talk later was replaced with an advice-oriented talk format on January 18, 2010.

The advice-talk programming included the syndicated morning show Bob and Tom from Indianapolis, syndicated family finance shows from Clark Howard and Dave Ramsey, psychological advice from The Dr. Laura Program and Dr. Joy Browne, as well as Loveline, NASCAR racing from the Motor Racing Network, and NFL football from Westwood One.

On September 15, 2009, it was announced that WBAE and WVAE would begin to broadcast the Boston Bruins. On January 16, 2012, it was announced that WBAE and WVAE would begin to broadcast the
New York Yankees.

In February 2013, WVAE split from its simulcast with WBAE, and began simulcasting the news-talk programming of co-owned WGAN, to help WGAN better cover York County. WVAE took on the call letters WGIN to echo its originating station.

After four years under the talk format, WBAE flipped back to an Adult Standards format under its original 1490 The Bay branding on October 21, 2013, utilizing programming from Westwood One’s Adult Standards network, "America's Best Music." Dave Ramsey and Clark Howard moved to WZAN.  Dr. Joy Browne is heard on WTSN in nearby Dover, New Hampshire.  Artists heard on WBAE included The Beatles, The Carpenters, Frank Sinatra and Dionne Warwick.

On December 16, 2015, WBAE began simulcasting WZAN's talk format. WZAN's talk programming moved exclusively to WBAE on January 1, 2016, with WZAN becoming a sports radio station carrying ESPN Radio programming.  In May 2016, WBAE began simulcasting on FM translator 107.1 W296CZ.

On May 7, 2018, WBAE and WVAE flipped to soft adult contemporary, once again under the branding The Bay. WVAE is simulcast on a second FM translator in Biddeford, W228EE (93.5), which concurrently launched with the flip.

References

External links

FCC History Cards for WBAE (covering 1946-1981 as WMTW / WPOR)  

BAE
Soft adult contemporary radio stations in the United States
Radio stations established in 1946
BAE
1946 establishments in Maine